The term Lourdes effect has been coined by the Belgian philosopher and skeptic Etienne Vermeersch to account for the observation that some supernatural powers seem to have a sort of resistance to manifesting themselves in a completely unambiguous fashion. According to Vermeersch, should the miraculous power of Lourdes actually exist there would be no reason to think that it would be more difficult for the Virgin Mary or God to reattach a severed arm than to cure paralysis or blindness. According to Vermeersch, the visions and photos of, for instance, the Loch Ness Monster and the Yeti lack reliability and clarity due to a similar effect.

Vermeersch uses this term to mock what he calls the selective and uncritical approach to miracles, or the frivolous attribution of supernatural gifts to human beings. Skeptics note that the number of fatal accidents that occur on the way to and from Lourdes may well be considerably higher than the 67 alleged miracles due to faith healing recognized in 2005 by the Vatican.

References

Further reading
Etienne Vermeersch, Van Antigone tot Dolly. Veertig jaar kritisch denken, Antwerpen, Hadewijch, 1997, 256 pp. (i.e. From Antigone to Dolly: Forty Years of Critical Thinking)

Supernatural healing 
Spiritualism 
Effect
Paranormal terminology
Our Lady of Lourdes